is an international department store chain with headquarters in Tokyo, Japan. It is a subsidiary of Isetan Mitsukoshi Holdings, which also owns the Isetan department store chain.

History 
Ten years later in 1683, Echigoya took a new approach to marketing. Instead of selling by going door-to-door, they set up a store where buyers could purchase goods on the spot with cash. Mitsukoshimae Station on the Tokyo Metro is named after the adjacent Mitsukoshi department store.

Mitsukoshi is the root of Mitsui group.

Genichiro Inokuma designed the wrapping paper in white and red.

In August 2007, it was announced that Mitsukoshi would merge into Isetan, a major department store in Japan. Mitsukoshi  was unlisted on March 26, 2008, and on April 1, it merged with Isetan under a joint holding company called Isetan Mitsukoshi Holdings Ltd..

On April 5, 2019, Mitsukoshi announced that it would further expand its Asian presence by having a Filipino branch established by 2021 at Bonifacio Global City, in Taguig, Metro Manila, Philippines. The store opened on November 18, 2022.

Stores

Japan

Stores managed by Isetan Mitsukoshi Ltd.
 Nihonbashi Main Branch (Chūō, Tokyo) 
 Ginza Mitsukoshi (Chūō, Tokyo)

Stores managed by other companies
 Sapporo Store (Chūō-ku, Sapporo)  - Sapporo Mitsukoshi Ltd.
 Sendai Store (Aoba-ku, Sendai)  - Sendai Mitsukoshi Ltd.
 Nagoya Sakae Main Branch (Naka-ku, Nagoya)  - Nagoya Mitsukoshi Ltd.
 Hoshigaoka Mitsukoshi (Chikusa-ku, Nagoya)  - Nagoya Mitsukoshi Ltd.
 Hiroshima Mitsukoshi (Naka-ku, Hiroshima)  - Hiroshima Mitsukoshi Ltd.
 Takamatsu Mitsukoshi  - Takamatsu Mitsukoshi Ltd.
 Matsuyama Mitsukoshi  - Matsuyama Mitsukoshi Ltd.
 Fukuoka Mitsukoshi (Chūō-ku, Fukuoka)  - Iwataya Mitsukoshi Ltd.

Closed
 Shinjuku Mitsukoshi Alcott (Shinjuku, Tokyo) 
 Ikebukuro Mitsukoshi (Toshima, Tokyo)  - closed May 2009 
 Musashimurayama Mitsukoshi (Musashimurayama, Tokyo) 
 Kagoshima Mitsukoshi 
 Tama Center Mitsukoshi (Tama, Tokyo) 
 Chiba Mitsukoshi (Chūō-ku, Chiba) 
 Niigata Mitsukoshi (Nishibori-dōri)  - Niigata Isetan Mitsukoshi Ltd.
 JR Osaka Isetan Mitsukoshi (Umeda, Kita-ku, Osaka) 
 Ebisu Mitsukoshi (Shibuya, Tokyo)  - closed February 2021

China

 Shanghai (Okura Garden Hotel)
 Shin Kong Place (Suzhou)
 Shin Kong Place (Chongqing)
 Shin Kong Place (Chengdu)

Taiwan
The stores in Taiwan are named , a collaboration between the Shin Kong Group and Mitsukoshi. The first Shin Kong Mitsukoshi store opened at Nanjing Road in Taipei in 1991.

The following branches are open as of 2022:

Taipei:
 Nanjing Road Store, with three buildings (and )
 Xinyi New Life Square: 4 buildings (A4, A8, A9, and A11)
 Taipei Main Station Store
 Tianmu Store
Taoyuan:
 Dayou Road Store
 Taoyuan Station Store
 Taichung:
 Zhonggang Road Store
 Chiayi:
 Chuiyang Road Store
Tainan:
 Zhongshan Road Store
 Ximen Road Store
Kaohsiung:
 Sanduo Shopping District Store
 Zuoying District Store

Philippines
 Taguig: Bonifacio Global City The Seasons (November 18, 2022)

Former stores
 China: The Dalian store closed at the end of the Second World War.
 Hong Kong: The first Mitsukoshi in Hong Kong, covering 12000 sq meters on 4 levels, opened at 500 Hennessy Road, Causeway Bay on 26 August 1981. A second store opened in 1988 in the Sun Arcade in Tsim Sha Tsui, but it closed in 1995. Mitsukoshi closed its original Causeway Bay store on 17 September 2006, due to the redevelopment of Hennessy Centre.
 South Korea: In 1930, Mitsukoshi opened a department store in downtown Keijō (today Seoul). After the liberation of Korea and the defeat of Japan in 1945, Samsung took over this store and renamed it Shinsegae (lit. "New World").

Europe

Former stores
 London (Piccadilly) - The London store opened in 1979 and closed in 2013.
 Paris - Opened in 1971 and closed in 2010.
 Rome - Opened in 1975 and closed in 2021.
 Milan
 Düsseldorf
 Frankfurt
 Munich

North America
 Walt Disney World (Orlando, Florida, United States) – in the Japan Pavilion, which Mitsukoshi hosts and operates, at the Epcot World Showcase.

Former Stores
 New York City - Mitsukoshi opened a 10,000 sq ft boutique and restaurant in rented space in the Ritz Tower apartment building at 57th Street and Park Avenue on March 16, 1979. In 1991, Mitsukoshi bought that space, as well as 30,000 sq ft of additional adjoining space, and opened a much larger outlet, which subsequently closed. Mitsukoshi opened a small popup store for one week only in SoHo during New York Fashion Week in February 2014.

References

External links

Official website 
Mitsukoshi, Ltd. Annual Report 
Mitsukoshi London 
Mitsukoshi Roma 
Shin Kong Mitsukoshi 

Department stores of Japan
Department stores of Hong Kong
Department stores of China
Department stores of Taiwan
Japanese Imperial Warrant holders
Retail companies established in 1673
Retail companies based in Tokyo
Shopping in Taipei
Japanese brands
Mitsui
1673 establishments in Japan
2003 mergers and acquisitions
2008 mergers and acquisitions